Sugarloaf Mountain (Portuguese: Pão de Açúcar) is a peak situated in Rio de Janeiro, Brazil. 

Pão de Açúcar may also refer to:
 Pão de Açúcar, Alagoas, a municipality located in Alagoas, Brazil
 Audax Rio de Janeiro Esporte Clube, a football club formerly known as Sendas Pão de Açúcar Esporte Clube 
 Audax São Paulo Esporte Clube, a football club formerly known as Pão de Açúcar Esporte Clube
 GPA (company), a Brazilian retail company formerly known as Grupo Pão de Açúcar
 Pão de Açúcar (supermarket), a supermarket owned by GPA